The 1984 Team Ice Racing World Championship was the sixth edition of the Team World Championship. The final was held on 10/11 March, 1984, in Deventer in the Netherlands. The Soviet Union won their fifth title.

Classification

See also 
 1984 Individual Ice Speedway World Championship
 1984 Speedway World Team Cup in classic speedway
 1984 Individual Speedway World Championship in classic speedway

References 

Ice speedway competitions
World